The England national cricket team visited India in February 1980 and played a single Test match against the India national cricket team. It was played to celebrate the golden jubilee of the formation of Board of Control for Cricket in India.

Test series

Only Test

References

External links
 Cricarchive
 Tour page CricInfo
 Record CricInfo

1980 in English cricket
1980 in Indian cricket
1980
Indian cricket seasons from 1970–71 to 1999–2000
International cricket competitions from 1975–76 to 1980
February 1980 sports events in Asia